Brea Olinda High School is a 9th–12th grade public high school located in Brea, California. Established in 1927, the school was originally located across the street from the Brea Mall. In 1989, the school moved to its current location on the northern hills of Brea. Brea Olinda High School is a part of the Brea Olinda Unified School District.

History
Plans were made in 1924 to make a separate high school in Brea; some parents pushed back and insisted that their children remain at Fullerton Union High School. Construction commenced in 1926; despite some shortcomings by the original contractor, the $400,000 project was finished in time for the 1927–1928 school year. The school's initial enrollment was approximately 200 students and at the original location the school had a working farm as part of Future Farmers of America (FFA).

By 1989, the school population had grown and the high school needed major renovations. The school district decided to construct the new Brea Olinda High School at 789 Wildcat Way, and it opened in September 1989. The new school location would not include a working farm as part of Future Farmers of America (FFA).

Athletics
BOHS football teams won CIF championships from 1959 to 1962, and again in 2018. The girls basketball team has won ten CIF State Championships.

Performing arts
Brea Olinda fields four competitive show choirs: the mixed-gender "Masquerade", the all-female "Spellbound" and "Tiffanys", and the all-male "Thundercats". The program hosts an annual competition, the California Classic.

Notable alumni
 James Cameron, director
 Kyle Fogg, professional basketball player
 Tommy Gallarda, professional football player
 James Hetfield, musician
 Randy Jones, professional baseball player
 Evan Moore, professional football player
 Jeanette Pohlen, professional basketball player

References

External links

Brea Olinda High School

High schools in Orange County, California
Brea, California
Public high schools in California
School buildings completed in 1989
1927 establishments in California
Educational institutions established in 1927